The Defence and Ex-Services Party of Australia was a minor Australian political party operating from 1986 to 1989. Formally registered on 1 September 1986, its policies included greater investment in care for veterans, a stronger national defence system, and maintenance of high disability pensions. The party contested the 1987 federal election, running for the Senate in New South Wales, and also the 1988 New South Wales state election. It was voluntarily deregistered on 4 May 1989.

References

1986 establishments in Australia
1989 disestablishments in Australia
Defunct political parties in Australia
Political parties established in 1986
Political parties disestablished in 1989